Jan Zweyer (born December 12, 1953, in Frankfurt (Main))) is a German writer. Jan Zweyer is only his pen name. His real name is Rüdiger Richartz.

Career
He first graduated in architecture and then in social sciences and worked as scientific clerk. After that he worked as a freelance journalist. He has been working for an international industrial company for several years and only writes in his leisure. Zweyer writes detective stories which deal in the Ruhr and are very popular in Northrhine-Westphalia because of its naturalistic descriptions.

Novels
1998 Glück auf. Glück ab . .
1999 Alte Genossen . .
1999 Siebte Sohle, Querschlag West . .
1999 Tödliches Abseits . .
2000 Georgs Geheimnis . .
2001 Tatort Töwerland . .
2002 Glänzender Tod . .
2004 Verkauftes Sterben . .
2005 Als der Himmel verschwand . .
2007 Franzosenliebchen, Grafit Verlag, . OCLC .
2009 Goldfasan, Grafit Verlag,  .
2011 Persilschein, Grafit Verlag, . .

Short stories
2002 Nur wir allein
2002 Das Skelett von Königsborn
2004 Mit Walther in Aldekerk
2004 Margarethe
 2006 Goleo, Pille, Pils und Schalke
 2006 Die lieben Kleinen
 2008 Langes Wochenende
 2008 Zappels Plan
 2009 Knapp vorbei ist auch daneben
 2009 Ausverkauf

Private life
He lives in Herne in the Ruhr  with his wife and his dog.

References

External links
 
Official Homepage
German detective story lexicon
Jan Zweyer in: NRW Literatur im Netz 

German crime fiction writers
German male short story writers
German short story writers
1953 births
Living people
German male novelists